Boonea kinpana is a species of sea snail, a marine gastropod mollusk in the family Pyramidellidae, the pyrams and their allies. The species is one of eleven species within the Boonea genus of gastropods.

Distribution
This marine species occurs off the coasts of Japan. The species is also populous throughout marine terrain off the coast of Yamaguchi Prefecture.

References

External links
 To Biodiversity Heritage Library (1 publication)
 To Encyclopedia of Life
 To USNM Invertebrate Zoology Mollusca Collection
 To World Register of Marine Species

Pyramidellidae
Gastropods described in 1999